The 1976 Iowa Hawkeyes football team was an American football team that represented the University of Iowa in the 1976 Big Ten Conference football season. In their third year under head coach Bob Commings, the Hawkeyes compiled a 5–6 record (3–5 against conference opponents) and finished in a three-way tie for seventh place in the Big Ten.

Quarterback Butch Caldwell and tight end Tom Grine were selected as the team's most valuable players. Caldwell led the team with 616 passing yards and 1,005 yards of total offense. Jon Lazar led the team in rushing with 392 yards. Tom Rusk was selected by the conference coaches as a second-team linebacker on the UPI's 1976 All-Big Ten Conference football team.

Schedule

Roster

Season summary

at Illinois

Syracuse

at Penn State

Penn State missed a 25-yard field goal with 47 seconds left.

at USC

Ohio State

Indiana

at Minnesota

Northwestern

at Wisconsin

Purdue

at Michigan State

References

Iowa
Iowa Hawkeyes football seasons
Iowa Hawkeyes football